MacPherson MRT station is an underground Mass Rapid Transit (MRT) interchange station on the Downtown line and Circle line in Geylang planning area, Singapore, located underneath Paya Lebar Road at the junction with Circuit Link and Ubi Avenue 2.

Named after the nearby MacPherson estate, which itself was named after Colonel Ronald MacPherson, the first Colonial Secretary of the Straits Settlements in 1867, this station serves not only the residents of MacPherson estate but also the Ubi industrial estate.

History

Contract 822 for the construction of MacPherson station was awarded to Econ Corporation Ltd - NCC International AB Joint Venture at a contract sum of more than S$300 million. However, in 2005, Econ Corporation later dropped out due to financial difficulties, and LTA had sought to replace the contractors involved due to 'major outstanding works' on the two stations. To facilitate the construction for the CCL station, part of Paya Lebar Road, Circuit Link and Ubi Avenue 2 had to be realigned. In September 2007, Chye Joo Construction has won the tender to finish building the MacPherson and Tai Seng MRT stations at a contract sum of S$17.5 million.

The station was opened on 17 April 2010 along with the rest of Stage 1 & 2 of the Circle line.

Downtown line interchange
Contract 931 for the design and construction of DTL MacPherson station and associated tunnels was awarded to Sato Kogyo (S) Pte Ltd at a sum of S$188 million in April 2011. Construction of the station and the tunnels commenced in the second quarter of that year and completed in 2017.

The station became an interchange with the Downtown line when Stage 3 of the line opened on 21 October 2017, as announced by the Land Transport Authority (LTA) on 31 May that year.

Art-in-Transit
On the Circle line, the featured artwork Virtuous Cycle by Kay Kok Chung Oi signifies the symbolic meaning of this station, portraying the congregation of human dynamism and its cerebral energy, channeled and sustained by the ‘machinery’ of the station. The different colours of the arrows signify the public converging upon the MacPherson vicinity while the station is represented by the red rectangles. The station performs the role of a conduit, connecting people to MacPherson, as well as celebrating the continued vibrancy of the MacPherson community itself.

Civil Defence Shelter
MacPherson CCL station is one of eleven stations along the Circle line designated as Civil Defence (CD) shelters, which will be activated in times of national emergency. Apart from reinforced construction, the stations are designed and equipped with facilities to ensure the shelter environment is tolerable for all users during shelter occupation. These facilities include protective blast doors, decontamination facilities, ventilation systems, power and water supply systems and a dry toilet system.

References

External links

 

Railway stations in Singapore opened in 2010
Geylang
Mass Rapid Transit (Singapore) stations